Eugene Joseph "Gene" Millerick (July 29, 1924 – May 5, 2013) was an American politician and businessman.

Born in Plainville, Connecticut, he served in the United States Army Air Forces during World War II and went to Clemson University. He was in the real estate and insurance businesses. He served in the Connecticut House of Representatives 1986-1994 as a Democrat.

Notes

1924 births
2013 deaths
People from Plainville, Connecticut
Clemson University alumni
United States Army Air Forces soldiers
Businesspeople from Connecticut
Democratic Party members of the Connecticut House of Representatives
20th-century American businesspeople